John F 'Ginger' McGee is an Irish born greyhound trainer. He is a seven times champion trainer of Great Britain and was regarded as the leading trainer during the early 1990s.

Career
McGee first came to national attention as head man to Fred Wiseman in 1987. He took over the Peaceful kennels in Ockendon Road, Upminster during 1988 and instantly gained success by winning the 1988 English Greyhound Derby with Hit the Lid in his maiden year. Gino reached the same final for McGee and Sard won the 1988 Gold Collar. The year ended with McGee claiming the Greyhound Trainer of the Year title.

1989 proved to be another notable year as McGee became Champion trainer for the second time and won the Trainers Championship. He joined Hackney from Canterbury in 1990 replacing Doreen Boyce and won a third consecutive Trainers title. A fourth trainers title in 1991, with 209 winners, represented a new record beating the three titles won by George Curtis and Phil Rees Sr.

In 1992 he joined Peterborough Greyhound Stadium and finished runner-up in the 1992 English Greyhound Derby with Winsor Abbey  before he moved to Reading Stadium. In 1992, he secured his second Trainers Championship, winning four of the eight races that formed the event, he finished on 56 points, which was 22 points ahead of second placed Patsy Byrne on 34.

Controversy
Despite extending his record to seven Trainers titles in 1994, controversy was to follow the remainder of McGee's career. The National Greyhound Racing Club (NGRC) revoked his trainers licence following a positive urine test for one of his greyhounds. McGee was unhappy at the severity of the punishment and the two parties went to court. A high court judge overturned the NGRC suspension but the NGRC then continued the court battle before McGee returned to Ireland to train and would not be seen in NGRC racing again for four years.

In 1998 McGee returned to England after selling his Woodlands Kennels in County Kildare and leased the Halls Green Farm kennels at Roydon, Essex where former Walthamstow greyhounds were reared. After regaining his licence he was given an attachment at Rye House Stadium and returned to Reading in 1998. In 2001 he opposed the decision by the Professional Greyhound Trainers' Association (PGTA) to allow John Mullins to replace his mother Linda Mullins, in the Trainers Championship, following her retirement. McGee's had been denied an invitation to run in 1988 when he took over the kennels from Fred Wiseman under the same scenario.

The controversy surrounding McGee continued when in 2001 he had a second positive urine sample. His licence was withdrawn and he was told that no further applications would be considered until January 2003. Ireland's governing body the Bord na gCon under chairman, Paschal Taggart, circulated a letter to the Department of Arts, Tourism and Sports, underlining that the authority did not approve of McGee training in Ireland. McGee then applied to the Clonmel based Irish Coursing Club which approved his licence. His daughter Keeley took over the kennel and then they returned to Ireland eventually taking kennels at County Meath.

Post 2009
He had his seven year ban from entering runners at British greyhound tracks lifted by the Greyhound Board of Great Britain in 2009. In later years he reached the 2009 Irish Greyhound Derby final and the 2010 English Greyhound Derby final and won the 2013 Irish Cesarewitch. He is now based in Kildare.

Awards
He won the Greyhound Trainer of the Year seven times (1988, 1989, 1990, 1991, 1992, 1993 and 1994), a record that stood until 2016 when surpassed by Mark Wallis and won the Trainers Championship twice in 1989 and 1992.

References 

British greyhound racing trainers
Irish greyhound racing trainers
Sportspeople from County Tyrone
Living people
Year of birth missing (living people)